The Hong Kong League Cup 2006–07 is the 7th staging of the Hong Kong League Cup.

The competition started on 11 January 2007 with 10 Hong Kong First Division clubs and was concluded on 18 March 2007 with the final.

Kitchee regained their second consecutive League Cup champion by winning 2-1 against Happy Valley in the final. They also won a HKD$80,000 championship prize.

Teams
Citizen
Happy Valley
HKFC
Hong Kong 08
Rangers
Kitchee
Lanwa Redbull
South China
Wofoo Tai Po
Xiangxue Sun Hei

Details
 The 10 teams in Hong Kong First Division League is divided into groups A and B. Each team plays one match with other teams in the group once. The top 2 teams of the groups qualify for semi-finals.
 The teams are allocated in the groups according to their league positions after half season. Group A consists of Kitchee (1st), Lanwa Redbull (4th), Xiangxue Sun Hei (5th), Wofoo Tai Po (8th) and Hong Kong 08 (10th). Group B consists of South China (2nd), Rangers (3rd), Happy Valley (6th), Citizen (7th) and HKFC (9th).

Group stage

Group A

Group B

Knockout stage
All times are Hong Kong Time (UTC+8).

Bracket

Semi-finals

Final

Scorers
 4 goals
  Victor Eromosele Inegbenoise of Xiangxue Sun Hei

 3 goals
  Fábio Lopes of Happy Valley
  Lico of Xiangxue Sun Hei

 2 goals
  Chao Pengfei of Citizen
  Jorginho of Citizen
  Gerard Ambassa Guy of Happy Valley
  Law Chun Bong of Happy Valley
  Poon Yiu Cheuk of Happy Valley
  Darko Rakočević of Kitchee
  Ivan Jević of Kitchee
  Julius Akosah of Kitchee
  Wilfed Bamnjo of Kitchee
  Aldo Villalba of Lanwa Redbull
  Godfred Karikari of Rangers
  Detinho of South China

 1 goal
  Leung Chun Pong of Citizen
  Cheung Sai Ho of Happy Valley
  Evanor of Happy Valley
  Cheng Lai Hin of HKFC
  Jaimes Mckee of HKFC
  Michael John Challoner of HKFC
  Wong Yiu Fu of HKFC
  Au Yeung Yiu Chung of Hong Kong 08
  Keith Gumbs of Kitchee
  Liu Quankun of Kitchee
  Luk Koon Pong of Kitchee
  Lin Zhong of Lanwa Redbull
  Alex Xavier of Rangers
  Fan Weijun of Rangers
  Lo Kwan Yee of Rangers
  Cheng Siu Wai of South China
   Cristiano Alves Pereira of South China
  Li Haiqiang of South China
  Tales Schutz of South China
  Chiu Chun Kit of Wofoo Tai Po
  Christian Kwesi Annan of Wofoo Tai Po
  Edgar Aldrighi Junior of Wofoo Tai Po
  Lui Chi Hing of Wofoo Tai Po
  Barnes Colly Ezeh of Xiangxue Sun Hei
  Chan Yiu Lun of Xiangxue Sun Hei
  Cordeiro of Xiangxue Sun Hei

Individual prizes
 Best Defensive Player Award: Darko Rakočević of Kitchee
 Top Goalscorer: Victor Eromosele Inegbenoise of Xiangxue Sun Hei

Trivia
 Happy Valley has lost in the League Cup for the 5th consecutive season.
 Happy Valley suffers their 7th consecutive losses in the final of local competitions.
 All three goals in the final were from free kicks. The goal of Happy Valley was from a Penalty kick while the two goals of Kitchee were from a Direct free kick and Indirect free kick respectively.
 The semi-finals were originally scheduled to play in Mong Kok Stadium. However, the 4 teams in the semi-finals suggested HKFA to move the matches to Hong Kong Stadium. However, after the matches, many football fans expressed their opinions that this is a main cause for the low attendance on that day.

See also
Hong Kong League Cup
The Hong Kong Football Association
2006–07 in Hong Kong football
Hong Kong FA Cup 2006-07
Hong Kong First Division League 2006-07
Hong Kong Senior Shield 2006-07

References

External links
Fixtures at HKFA.com

Hong Kong League Cup
League Cup
Hong Kong League Cup